Manfred Green is an Israeli epidemiologist. He is in charge of their International Master's in Public Health Program and is a professor in the epidemiology department.

Early life
At the University of the Witwatersrand, he earned a B.Sc. In mathematical statistics. At the University of Cape Town  he earned a medical degree. At the University of North Carolina at Chapel Hill, Green earned a MPH and PhD.

Career

Public sector
From 1986 until 1989, Green was in charge of the Army Health Department as well as of the Epidemiology Unit at the Institute of Occupational Health and Rehabilitation (1982-1986 and 1989-1984). At the Ministry of Health between 1994 and 2008, Green was in charge of the National Center for Disease Control.

Academia 
Green headed the University of Haifa’s School of Public Health. From 1999-2003, Green served as head of the Department of Epidemiology and Preventive Medicine at the Sackler Faculty of Medicine.

Selected publications
Myocarditis after BNT162b2 Vaccination in Israeli Adolescents

References

Living people
Year of birth missing (living people)
Israeli epidemiologists
Israeli academic administrators
University of North Carolina at Chapel Hill alumni
University of Cape Town alumni
University of the Witwatersrand alumni
Academic staff of the University of Haifa
Academic staff of Tel Aviv University